Lay Armachiho is a woreda in Amhara Region, Ethiopia. This woreda is named after "Armachiho", a province in northwestern Ethiopia along the border with Sudan and south of the Tekezé River. Part of the Semien Gondar Zone, Lay Armachiho is bordered on the south by Dembiya, on the west by Chilga, on the north by Tach Armachiho, on the east by Wegera, and on the southeast by Gondar Zuria. The administrative center of this woreda is Tekle Dingay.

Lay Armachiho was selected by the Ministry of Agriculture and Rural Development as an area for voluntary resettlement for farmers from overpopulated areas in the fourth round of  resettlement program. Along with Qwara and Dangila in the Amhara Region, and Tsegede in the Tigray Region, this woreda became the new home for 8,671 families. This round of resettlement was reportedly accompanied with almost 68 million Birr in infrastructure development.

Demographics
Based on the 2007 national census conducted by the Central Statistical Agency of Ethiopia (CSA), this woreda has a total population of 157,836, an increase of 34.36% over the 1994 census, of whom 79,538 are men and 78,298 women; 12,546 or 7.95% are urban inhabitants. With an area of 1,059.33 square kilometers, Lay Armachiho has a population density of 149.00, which is greater than the Zone average of 63.76 persons per square kilometer. A total of 33,373 households were counted in this woreda, resulting in an average of 4.73 persons to a household, and 32,420 housing units. The majority of the inhabitants practiced Ethiopian Orthodox Christianity, with 97.9% reporting that as their religion, while 2% of the population said they were Muslim.
The Qemant, one of the Agaw people, are the largest ethnic group living in this woreda, and are concentrated around the town of Tekle Dingay. The head priest in Tekle Dingay has more prestige than his counterpart in Chilga woreda, because he rules their traditional homeland.

The 1994 national census reported a total population for this woreda of 117,471 in 21,411 households, of whom 58,697 were men and 58,774 women; 4,784 or 4.07% of its population were urban dwellers at the time. The two largest ethnic groups reported in Lay Armachiho were the Qemant (63.89%), and the Amhara (35.76%); all other ethnic groups made up 0.35% of the population. Amharic was spoken as a first language by 99.73%; the remaining 0.27% spoke all other primary languages reported. The majority of the inhabitants practiced Ethiopian Orthodox Christianity, with 97.1% reporting that belief, while 2.72% of the population said they were Muslim.

Notes

Districts of Amhara Region
North Gondar Zone